Latest Greatest Straitest Hits is the fifth compilation album by American country music artist George Strait. It was released on March 7, 2000 by MCA Records. The album represents his greatest hits since the release of his 1995 box set Strait Out of the Box. The set contains two newly recorded tracks. "The Best Day" was released as a single and hit #1 on Billboards Hot Country Singles & Tracks. Although not a single, "Murder on Music Row" (a duet with Alan Jackson) also charted in the Top 40 from unsolicited airplay.

The album does not include any singles from his 1999 album Always Never the Same. Another notable omission is "I Just Want to Dance with You", a #1 hit from 1998.

In March 2003 the album was certified Double Platinum by the RIAA.

Track listing

 Personnel Tracks 1 and 2'
 Eddie Bayers – drums
 Stuart Duncan – fiddle
 Paul Franklin – steel guitar
 Steve Gibson – acoustic guitar
 Wes Hightower – background vocals on "The Best Day"
 Alan Jackson – lead vocals and background vocals on "Murder on Music Row"
 Liana Manis – background vocals on "The Best Day"
 Brent Mason – electric guitar
 Steve Nathan – keyboards
 George Strait – lead vocals, background vocals on "Murder on Music Row"
 Lee Ann Womack – background vocals on "Murder on Music Row"
 Glenn Worf – bass guitar

Charts

Weekly charts

Year-end charts

References 

2000 compilation albums
George Strait compilation albums
MCA Records compilation albums
Albums produced by Tony Brown (record producer)